Lasnamäe is the most populous administrative district of Tallinn, the capital of Estonia. The district's population is about 119,000, the majority of which is Russian-speaking. Local housing is mostly represented by 5–16 stories high panel blocks of flats, built in the 1970–1990s.

The district lies in the eastern part of Tallinn. In the east it is bordered by the Pirita River; in the north and northwest a limestone escarpment (part of the Baltic Klint) separates Lasnamäe from Pirita and Kesklinn. The district is situated on a flat limestone plateau that lies 30–52 m above sea level. The highest point in Lasnamäe is the Sõjamägi Hill at 54 m asl.

Lasnamäe can be divided into two distinct areas: the northern part is residential, while the southern part around Peterburi Road (Tallinn-Narva road, part of E20) and up to the border with Rae Parish is mainly industrial. Lennart Meri Tallinn Airport is also administratively located in Lasnamäe.

History
The oldest traces of human activity in the Lasnamäe area date from Early Neolithic.

In the Middle Ages some small hamlets were situated on the territory of present-day Lasnamäe. At that time Lasnamäe was mainly known for limestone quarries, as nearly the whole of Medieval Tallinn was built of local limestone.

At the end of the 19th century, during the period of industrial expansion, some major factories were set up in Lasnamäe, including the Dvigatel factory, which had 2,260 workers in 1900. In 1904 Sikupilli, the first residential suburb in Lasnamäe, was laid out. Sikupilli remained the main residential area of Lasnamäe until the construction of microdistricts started in the 1970s.

Construction of pre-fabricated concrete apartment blocks under the concept of microdistrict, for which Lasnamäe is today best known, started first in 1973 and at a massive scale in 1977. This process lasted until the restoration of Estonian independence and completely changed the environment in Lasnamäe. According to the first concepts Lasnamäe was planned to house 160,000–180,000 inhabitants.

Several subdistricts – e.g. Katleri, Mustakivi, Priisle, Seli – inherited their names from the farms or hamlets on whose territory they were built.

During the Singing Revolution in the late 1980s, the combination of the grim mass housing and dominant Russian-speaking migrant population led to calls among ethnic Estonians to ‘stop Lasnamäe’. The phrase  Peatage Lasnamäe!, taken from the popular song Mingem üles mägedele performed by Ivo Linna, became one of the slogans of the Singing Revolution.

During the 1990s there was little development in Lasnamäe and the district fell into a standstill. Compared with other areas in Tallinn, it attracted little investment and had the lowest real-estate prices. In recent years the situation has changed – many new apartment blocks, both by municipal government and private investors, and several hypermarkets  have been built in the district.

Population

The population of Lasnamäe is 118,557, which comprises 27% of the total population of Tallinn. Lasnamäe is by far the most populous district of Tallinn – the next largest, Mustamäe, has 66,000 inhabitants.

The population of Lasnamäe is predominantly Russian-speaking – in 2009, 58.2% of its inhabitants were ethnically Russian, 6.0% Ukrainian and 3.3% Belarusian. Ethnic Estonians make up 28.3% of the population, down from 31.1% in 2005.
65% of Lasnamäe's inhabitants had Estonian citizenship.

Transport

The main road in Lasnamäe is the 4+4 Laagna Road, which runs in an east-west direction through the district and connects it at one end to the city centre, and at the other end to the Tallinn-Narva highway (E20) and Tallinn ring road (E265) at Väo. For most of its course the road is situated in a cutting in the limestone plateau. This has earned the road its nickname – Lasnamäe Channel or simply The Channel. It was a location for the shooting of Christopher Nolan's Tenet.

Public transport
A tram line services the older part of Lasnamäe (Sikupilli and Ülemiste subdistricts). The newer parts of Lasnamäe rely on a number of bus routes operated by the Tallinn Bus Company. A light rail line that would connect the bulk of Lasnamäe to the city centre was planned to be built already during the Soviet Era and with that in mind the Laagna Road was built with a wide central reservation. Despite 30 years of talking, the light rail line remains to be built.

Subdistricts
Lasnamäe is divided into 16 subdistricts: Katleri, Kurepõllu, Kuristiku, Laagna, Loopealse, Mustakivi, Pae, Paevälja, Priisle, Seli, Sikupilli, Sõjamäe, Tondiraba, Uuslinn, Väo, Ülemiste.

Sports
FC Ajax Lasnamäe is a  football club from Lasnamäe.

References

External links

Districts of Tallinn